Samdech Preah Mahā Somethea Dhipati Huot Tat (1 February 1893 – 1975), Dharma name: Vajirapañño, was the fifth Supreme Patriarch of the Maha Nikaya order of Cambodia.

Huot Tat was born in Oudong District, Kampong Speu Province. He joined the monkhood when he was 13. In 1969, he succeeded Chuon Nath as the new Supreme Patriarch of the Maha Nikaya order upon the latter's death.

On 17 April 1975, immediately after the Khmer Rouge's march into Phnom Penh, Huot Tat and all the Buddhist monks were ordered to leave the city. The next day, he was taken to Oudong, where he was insulted and beaten. He was executed at the Prang pagoda in Oudong district. His statue was later thrown into the Mekong River.

During the Khmer Rouge genocide, more than 25,000 monks were executed. 1,968 Buddhist buildings, including temples and monasteries, were destroyed.

References

1893 births
1975 deaths
Supreme Patriarchs of Cambodia
People who died in the Cambodian genocide
Buddhist martyrs
20th-century Buddhist monks